Thomas Perkins may refer to:

 Thomas Handasyd Perkins (1764–1854), American businessman and philanthropist
 Thomas Clap Perkins (1798–1870), American lawyer and politician
 Thomas Philip Perkins (1904–1978), English golfer
 Thomas Perkins (businessman) (1932–2016), American venture capitalist
 Thomas Perkins (cricketer) (1870–1946), English cricketer and footballer
 Thomas Luff Perkins (1867–?), British architect, engineer and colonial administrator
 Thomas Wayne Perkins better known as Thomas Wayne
 Thomas James Perkins, intendant mayor of Tallahassee, Florida